S. Cofré is or was a Chilean astronomer of the University of Chile, and co-discoverer of 11 minor planets together with Chilean astronomer Carlos Torres from the Cerro El Roble astronomical observatory, Chile, in 1968. One of her co-discoveries is the 10-kilometer sized inner main-belt asteroid and member of the Eos family, 1992 Galvarino, named for the 16th century Mapuche warrior.

See also

References 
 

20th-century astronomers
Chilean astronomers
Discoverers of asteroids

Living people
University of Chile alumni
Year of birth missing (living people)